Provița de Sus is a commune in Prahova County, Muntenia, Romania. It is composed of four villages: Izvoru, Plaiu, Provița de Sus and Valea Bradului.

Natives
 Tudor Postelnicu

References

Communes in Prahova County
Localities in Muntenia